Wendy A. Kellogg is an American psychologist and computer scientist who specializes in human-computer interaction. She founded the Social Computing Group at the Thomas J. Watson Research Center of IBM Research, and helped found the field of social computing.

Kellogg earned her Ph.D. in cognitive psychology from the University of Oregon under the supervision of Michael Posner. In 2002 Kellogg was named a Fellow of the Association for Computing Machinery "for contributions to social computing and human-computer interaction (HCI) and for service to ACM". In 2008 she was elected to the CHI Academy.

References

External links

21st-century American psychologists
American women psychologists
American computer scientists
American women computer scientists
Human–computer interaction researchers
University of Oregon alumni
Place of birth missing (living people)
Year of birth missing (living people)
Living people
21st-century American women